ThaiJet International was an international passenger charter airline based in Bangkok, Thailand. Its main base was Bangkok International Airport (BKK).

History
ThaiJet was established in 2003 and started operations on December 15, 2003. It operated international charter flights from Bangkok and Phuket, but these ceased in May 2004 pending re-financing.

In March 2006, Thailand's Civil Aviation Department said it was withdrawing the failed airline's license.

Services
International scheduled destinations were Berlin, Frankfurt, Malé, Seoul, Sharjah, Warsaw and Zhengzhou.

Fleet
ThaiJet operated two Boeing 757-200s, delivered in December 2003, but they were disposed of by mid-2004.

References

 Sritama, Suchat (March 7, 2006). "Phuket Air angles for new name, license, The Nation.

External links

ThaiJet (archive)

Defunct airlines of Thailand
Airlines established in 2003
Airlines disestablished in 2006
2006 disestablishments in Thailand
Thai companies established in 2003